E. Maurice "Buddy" Adler (June 22, 1906 – July 12, 1960) was an American film producer and production head for 20th Century Fox studios.

In 1954, his production of From Here to Eternity won the Academy Award for Best Picture and in 1956, his Love Is a Many-Splendored Thing was nominated for best picture. Adler also produced the 1956 film Bus Stop, starring Marilyn Monroe.

Biography
Adler was born in New York City in 1906 (some references have listed his birth year as 1908 or 1909). "Buddy" was a childhood nickname. His family ran a small chain of department stores and Adler did advertising copy for the chain. He began writing short stories in his spare time and published them under the name "Bradley Allen". In 1936 he moved to Hollywood where he wrote the Pete Smith short features for MGM. He wrote the screenplay for the short documentary film Quicker'n a Wink, which won an Oscar in 1940. He also owned a small string of movie showhouses, called the Hitching Post.

During World War II, Adler served in the Signal Corps (1941–1945), ending with the rank of colonel. 

In 1954 Alder moved from Columbia to Fox, where he produced several films.

Head of Fox
In 1956 Adler was named as Head of Production for 20th Century Fox, replacing Darryl F. Zanuck. In 1957 he established the Fox Talent School, with a $1 million budget. Actors who had their first starring roles under Adler include Elvis Presley, Pat Boone, Tommy Sands, Fabian, Stuart Whitman, Suzy Parker, Joanne Woodward, France Nuyen, May Britt, Bradford Dillman, Tony Randall, Barry Coe, and Diane Varsi.

Personal life
Adler was born in New York City. He moved to Los Angeles, California, in 1936 and resided there for the rest of his life. In 1940 he married actress Anita Louise Fremault (1915–1970), with whom he had two children. The family were at his bedside when he died in 1960, from lung cancer.

Awards
Adler received the Irving G. Thalberg Memorial Award in 1957. In 1958 he received the Golden Globe Cecil B. DeMille Award for lifetime achievement in motion pictures.

Death
Buddy Adler died of lung cancer, aged 54, in Los Angeles and was interred in the Forest Lawn Memorial Park Cemetery in Glendale, California. His widow, who is buried there as well, survived him by ten years.

Selected filmography

 Flaming Star  (1960, but died a week before filming started)
 North to Alaska  (1960, died midway through principal photography)
 The Inn of the Sixth Happiness  (1958)
 South Pacific  (1958)
 A Hatful of Rain  (1957)
 Heaven Knows, Mr. Allison  (1957)
 Anastasia  (1956)
 Bus Stop  (1956)
 The Revolt of Mamie Stover  (1956)
 The Bottom of the Bottle  (1956)
 The Lieutenant Wore Skirts  (1956)
 The Left Hand of God  (1955)
 Love Is a Many-Splendored Thing (1955)
 House of Bamboo  (1955)
 Soldier of Fortune  (1955)
 Violent Saturday  (1955)
 From Here to Eternity  (1953)
 Last of the Comanches (1953)
 The Harlem Globetrotters  (1951)
 Saturday's Hero  (1951)
 A Woman of Distinction  (1950)
 Tell It to the Judge  (1949)
 The Dark Past  (1948)
 Quicker'n a Wink (1940)

References

1906 births
1960 deaths
20th Century Studios people
Film producers from New York (state)
American film studio executives
Businesspeople from New York City
Burials at Forest Lawn Memorial Park (Glendale)
Deaths from lung cancer in California
Cecil B. DeMille Award Golden Globe winners
20th-century American businesspeople
Producers who won the Best Picture Academy Award
United States Army personnel of World War II
United States Army colonels
Military personnel from New York City